Allure is a women's beauty magazine published by Condé Nast Publications. A famous woman, typically an actress, singer, or model, is featured on the cover of each month's issue. Following are the names of each cover subject from the first issue of Allure in March 1991 to the most recent issue.

Allure

1990s

1991

1992

1993

1994

1995

1996

1997

1998

1999

2000s

2000

2001

2002

2003

2004

2005

2006

2007

2008

2009

2010s

2010

2011

2012

2013

2014

2015

2016

2017

2018

2019

2020s

2020

2021

2022

Allure Russia

Russian edition of Allure magazine was published from September 2012 to December 2016.

2012

2013

2014

2015

2016

References

External links
 Allure Magazine [United States (February 2000)]
 Linda Tresham's House of Magazines: Allure
 Allure Russia covers

Allure
Allure
Magazines published in the United States